Morciré Sylla (3 March 1948 or 22 September 1948– 12 August 2005) was a Guinea international football forward.

Career
Born in Kindia, Sylla played several youth sports, including football, volleyball, basketball and handball. He started playing senior football with local side Hafia F.C., and would play any field position.

Sylla represented Guinea at the 1968 Summer Olympics in Mexico City. He also made several appearances for the senior Guinea national football team, and played at the 1974 and 1976 African Cup of Nations finals.

Personal
Sylla died at age 57 on 12 August 2005.

References

External links

 
 

1948 births
2005 deaths
People from Kindia
Guinean footballers
Guinea international footballers
Olympic footballers of Guinea
Footballers at the 1968 Summer Olympics
1974 African Cup of Nations players
1976 African Cup of Nations players
Hafia FC players
Association football forwards